Axborough is a low wooded hill east of Cookley in north Worcestershire, England.

History

Its Saxon name meant hassock grass barrow.  This does not imply the existence of a tumulus, as in place names locally the term for them is low.  The word beorh refers to a variety of hill.

Axborough lies within an area that was common land until Parliamentary inclosure in the late 18th century.  A few houses exist along Axborough lane, but it is largely uninhabited.

External links

Hills of Worcestershire